The Durham Inter-Collegiate Christian Union, usually known as DICCU, is a Christian Union in Durham University￼￼. It is one of most prominent student Christian organisation in Universities. It was founded in its present form in 1931, but can trace its roots principle back in early 1920s and in name well before that.  It is affiliated to the Universities and Colleges Christian Fellowship (UCCF) and adopts the UCCF doctrinal basis. It is also affiliated to the International Fellowship of Evangelical Students.

Structure

Weekly meetings occur almost every college during term time; there is also a central meeting every Friday evening, which includes Bible study, prayer, and praise, and a central prayer meeting on Monday mornings. These events are aimed primarily at Christians, but people from all backgrounds are welcomed.

A Christmas carol service is held at the end of Michaelmas term in Durham Cathedral, where there are regularly more than 3000 students in attendance. This is the largest service held by the cathedral and one of the largest gatherings of Durham students in one place at any point in the year. DICCU also hosts an Easter carol service in the cathedral, and both of these services have traditional hymns accompanied by a short talk. Many other events are run throughout the year at both the central and college levels, and all of these events are aimed particularly at people who wish to find out more about Jesus and the beliefs of Christianity.

History
Durham is well known for its religious heritage, and in this highly religious atmosphere several attempts over past years to found Evangelical and Bible Unions died out. On 8 December 1919 one Durham man joined around 60 other students from Cambridge, Oxford and London at the Egypt General Mission Headquarters, Drayton Park for the inaugural Inter-Varsity Conference. The early 1920s saw the formation of 'Durham University Bible Union', but this did not last long. The university journals for 1922 and subsequent years show a Christian Union affiliated to the World's Student Christian Fellowship and to the Student Christian Movement, but whether the Bible Union and this movement are related is unclear.

Another attempt to found a Union was made in 1929, when two men from St John's gathered with others from their college. A Fresher from Bede, Joseph Harrison Stringer, also joined them, following a meeting with Norman Grubb over the summer. Weekly prayer meetings began, along with Bible studies held each Sunday and occasional extra meetings where outside speakers were welcomed. Over the coming terms it began to be regarded as a subsection of the aforementioned SCM, and witness to Christ's saving power and Biblical truth decreased.

In March 1931 Joseph Stringer wrote to the recently formed Inter-Varsity Fellowship (what is now known as UCCF) about a separate Union in Bede, where a number of other men were keen. He consequently attended the Inter-Varsity Conference that year, and a new Union was formed. Many were for remaining as a subsection of the SCM, but rather than a big storm there was simply an agreement to differ, with those in favour of the new Union determined to keep the saving death of Jesus and the truth of the Bible as central to their witness.

The Union struggled along for a year, at which point, following a post-dinner conversation in Hild on the topic 'spiritual certainty', around 20 women professed faith in Jesus. The men's Union quickly heard of it and joined forces with the women, and from there the Union grew rapidly.

In March 1932 the Union arranged a weekend House Party along with the Newcastle Colleges, taking advantage of Dr. Howard Guinness' trip to the North. At this event two undergraduate students professed faith in Jesus Christ.

References

Bibliography
 Christ and the Colleges / F. D. Coggan: London, Inter-Varsity Fellowship, 1934.
 Contending for the Faith: A History of the Evangelical Movement in the Universities and Colleges / Douglas Johnson: London, Inter-Varsity Press, 1979.
 From Cambridge to the world: 125 years of student witness / Oliver R. Barclay and Robert M. Horn : Leicester, Inter-Varsity Press, 2002, .

External links
 Durham Inter-Collegiate Christian Union website

DICCU
Christian
Christian organizations established in 1931
Christian denominations established in the 20th century